Paulo Williemsens da Fonseca e Silva is a former Olympic backstroke swimmer from Brazil, who participated at one Summer Olympics for his native country. At the 1948 Summer Olympics in London, he swam the 100-metre backstroke, reaching the semifinals.

References

Year of birth missing
Year of death missing
Swimmers at the 1948 Summer Olympics
Olympic swimmers of Brazil
Brazilian male backstroke swimmers